Piazza San Marco is a city square in Florence, Italy. In the center of the piazza is the Monument to Generale Manfredo Fanti.

Buildings around the square
Museo Nazionale di San Marco
Basilica di San Marco (Florence)
Accademia di Belle Arti di Firenze
Palazzina della Livia
Bernardo Fallani

Marco
Odonyms referring to religion